"The Groom's Still Waiting at the Altar" is a song written by Bob Dylan, recorded in Los Angeles in the spring of 1981 and released in September of that year as a B-side to the single "Heart of Mine". It was included on the compilation albums Biograph in 1985, Bob Dylan's Greatest Hits Volume 3 in 1994 and Dylan in 2007.

Composition
In their book Bob Dylan All the Songs: The Story Behind Every Track, authors Philippe Margotin and Jean-Michel Guesdon note that the song was written during the summer of 1980, but that it "could have found its place on Highway 61 Revisited or Blonde on Blonde". They describe the song as "imbued with surrealism and a series of images that are unrelated to each other", but also note the influence of Biblical prophecies on the lyrics, especially an apocalyptic line about the "Curtain risin' on a new age" and a reference to the River Jordan, "beyond which lies the Promised Land of the Hebrews, led by Moses".

Release 
"The Groom's Still Waiting at the Altar" was originally released only as a B-side to the "Heart of Mine" single and was not included on Dylan's 1981 album Shot of Love. It was, however, added to reissues of the Shot of Love vinyl LP in 1985, and has been present in all subsequent versions of the album across all formats. It is the only instance of Dylan revising an album's track list after its initial release.

Reception and legacy
Rolling Stone placed the song 90th on a list of the "100 Greatest Bob Dylan Songs of All Time". In an article accompanying the list, musician Todd Snider wrote: "Bob Dylan finds a million different ways to do one-four-five blues, Chuck Berry-style rock & roll, my favorite kind of song. I think there's a story getting told here that I don't totally understand, but who cares? It's just a great poem. I have no idea what the groom's still waiting at the altar for, but I feel terrible for him. Dylan invented this kind of song, where each verse has some wisdom being imparted without being preachy, like, 'I know God has mercy on those that are slandered and humiliated', and, 'I see people who are supposed to know better than to stand around like furniture'. It's perfect. I wish I had thought of it".

Destroyer's Dan Bejar cited it as his favourite Dylan song in a 2021 interview, saying, "He's effectively and kinda manically describing a world that's falling apart, but makes it sound fun. The chaos is infectious". 

A 2021 Guardian article included it on a list of "80 Bob Dylan songs everyone should know".

Credits 
Bob Dylan – guitar, harmonica, percussion, piano, keyboards, vocals, producer
Carolyn Dennis – background vocals
Steve Douglas – saxophone
Tim Drummond, Donald Dunn – bass guitar
Jim Keltner, Ringo Starr – drums [on "Heart of Mine"]
Clydie King – background vocals
Danny Kortchmar – electric guitar
Regina McCrory – background vocals
Carl Pickhardt – piano
Madelyn Quebec – background vocals
Steve Ripley, Fred Tackett, Ronnie Wood – guitar [on "Heart of Mine"]
William "Smitty" Smith – Hammond organ
Benmont Tench – keyboards
Monalisa Young – background vocals

Production
Vic Anesini – compact disc mastering
Dana Bisbee – assistant engineer
Bumps Blackwell – producer
Ken Perry – original LP mastering
Chuck Plotkin – producer
Toby Scott – engineer

Live versions
According to his official website, Dylan played the song five times live. All performances occurred in 1980.

Notable Covers 
Rod Stewart's version appeared on his 2009 album Once in a Blue Moon.

References

External links
 Lyrics at Bob Dylan's official site

Songs written by Bob Dylan
Bob Dylan songs
1985 songs
Song recordings produced by Chuck Plotkin